Donaghadee is a small town in County Down, Northern Ireland. It is in the civil parish of Donaghadee and the historic barony of Ards Lower. It had a population of 6,869 people in the 2011 Census.

History

The name 'Donaghadee' comes from Irish Domhnach Daoi, which has two possible meanings: "church of Daoi", after an unattested saint, or "church of the motte". Originally the site of a Gaelic ringfort, the Anglo-Normans built a motte-and-bailey castle on the site after they conquered the area in the late 12th century.

In the early 17th century, Hugh Montgomery settled Scottish Protestants there as part of the Plantation of Ulster, and it began to grow into a small town. The former Donaghadee Town Hall is a converted merchant's house which was completed in around 1770.

The town featured in the Irish Rebellion of 1798. On the morning of Pike Sunday, 10 June 1798 a force of United Irishmen, mainly from Bangor, Donaghadee, Greyabbey and Ballywalter attempted to occupy the town of Newtownards. They met with musket fire from the market house and were defeated.

Donaghadee was used in the 1759–1826 period by couples going to Portpatrick in Scotland to marry, as there was a daily packet boat. During this period, Portpatrick was known as the "Gretna Green for Ireland".

The lifeboat station at Donaghadee harbour, founded in 1910, is one of the most important on the Irish coast. The Sir Samuel Kelly is a noted lifeboat once based in Donaghadee and now on show and preserved at the harbour for her efforts over 50 years ago. On 31 January 1953, the lifeboat rescued many survivors in the Irish Sea from the stricken Larne–Stranraer car ferry, MV Princess Victoria.

Demography
On Census day (27 March 2011) there were 6,869 people living in Donaghadee (2,997 households), accounting for 0.38% of the NI total. The Census 2011 population represented an increase of 6.1% on the Census 2001 figure of 6,470. Of these:

 18.43% were aged under 16 years and 22.03% were aged 65 and over;
 51.89% of the usually resident population were female and 48.11% were male;
 82.84% belong to or were brought up in a 'Protestant and Other Christian (including Christian related)' religion and 6.39% belong to or were brought up in the Catholic faith;
 76.58% indicated that they had a British national identity, 31.26% had a Northern Irish national identity and 5.71% had an Irish national identity (respondents could indicate more than one national identity);
 44 years was the average (median) age of the population;
 11.98% had some knowledge of Ulster-Scots and 2.48% had some knowledge of Irish (Gaelic).

Lifeboat stations
Donaghadee is one of Northern Ireland's lifeboat stations.

Places of interest

Harbour and lighthouse

Donaghadee is known for its harbour and lighthouse. The initial plans and surveys for the harbour were made by John Rennie Senior. He died within two months of work beginning, and was succeeded by his son, John, later Sir John Rennie: the work was completed in 1825. The lighthouse, which was built in limestone was completed in the late 1830s. During the COVID-19 Quarantine, people, usually younger people would place painted stones which would show support to the National Health Service (NHS), major parts of Donaghadee, milestones or just fun drawings. They were removed in late-2020 but in mid-2022 a small bench in the motte was painted with smaller designs of the stones.

The Motte

The Motte or Moat in Donaghadee was originally a motte-and-bailey castle built by the Anglo-Normans in the late 12th century. The folly or castle on top of the motte was built by Daniel Delacherois in the early 19th century. It was used for storing the gunpowder, used for blasting, when the new harbour was being built between 1821 and 1834. Today it is part of a park, giving views across the town and seawards towards the Copeland Islands.

Other activities
Scenic walks include the marine walk at The Commons, which comprises a  semi-cultivated open space with bowls, tennis, several exercise equipment, putting and an adventure playground.
There are several restaurants and pubs in the town, including Grace Neill's, opened in 1611 as the "King's Arms", and which claims to be the oldest bar in Ireland (a claim also made by other pubs, including by Sean's Bar in Athlone).

Wildlife

Birds
The Copeland Bird Observatory is situated on Lighthouse Island, one of the three islands not far, and to be seen, from Donaghadee. It collects data on the migrating birds and by ringing them records the movements of the migratory species. The islands are an internationally important site for breeding Manx Shearwater and Arctic Tern.

Flora
Among the algae recorded from Donaghadee are Gastroclonium ovatum, Callophyllis laciniata, Fucus ceranoides, Desmarestia ligulata, Hordaria flagelliformis, Codium fragile ssp. atlanticum and Cladophora pygmaea.
Flowering plants have been recorded from Donaghadee and are listed with details by Hackney (1992).

Choir
Donaghadee Male Choir was founded in 1932. It began as a small local chorus performing in churches and other local functions. The choir has performed internationally and has a membership of over 70 people.

In the media
Donaghadee was the basis for the fictional town of Donaghadoo in the children's television series Lifeboat Luke, which was animated by the Donaghadee animation studio Straandlooper. The town was also used as a set for some of the film Mickybo and Me.

Donaghadee is seen in the films Robot Overlords starring Gillian Anderson, Divorcing Jack, Killing Bono and Mo the Mo Mowlam story, starring Julie Walters.

Donaghadee features as the fictional town of Port Devine in the BBC drama Hope Street which first aired in 2021.

Donaghadee is mentioned several times in the song Forty Shades of Green, written by Johnny Cash in 1959.

Sports
Donaghadee Rugby Football Club, which was formed by the Rev. Coote, played its first match against Bangor on 7 November 1885.

Donaghadee Football Club are junior football who play their home matches at Crommelin Park in the town. For the 2014-15 season they were members of Division 2C of the Northern Amateur Football League. An earlier club of the same name held membership of the same league from 1948 to 1953. Donaghadee FC and Donaghadee 11s were both promoted from their respective leagues in 2016/17.

Donaghadee Ladies' Hockey Club have two teams which play in Ulster Hockey leagues: The 1XI play in Senior League 3, while the 2XI are in Junior 8.

Donaghadee Sailing Club (which underwent redevelopment and in May 2009 with a new clubhouse opened).

Notable people

Bear Grylls, adventurer, writer and television presenter was raised in Donaghadee until he was 4 – his grandmother was Patricia, Lady Fisher.
Sir Walter Smiles and his daughter Patricia, Lady Fisher (both Ulster Unionist Party Westminster MPs) lived in the town.
Sarah Grand, author and feminist
Sylvia, Lady Hermon, former MP for North Down
John Magowan, PDC Darts professional

See also
 Lighthouses in Ireland
 List of localities in Northern Ireland by population
 List of towns and villages in Northern Ireland
 List of civil parishes of County Down
 List of RNLI stations
 Market Houses in Northern Ireland
 Belfast and County Down Railway

Further reading
 Allen, Harry. 2006.Donaghadee An Illustrated History. 
 Hill, I. 1986. Northern Ireland. The Blackstaff Press.

References

External links

 Visit Donaghadee
 "How Donaghadee Got Its Name"

 
Towns in County Down
Civil parish of Donaghadee